Gary Paul Colin Childs (born 19 April 1964) is an English former professional footballer and coach who is the sports development manager at Grimsby Institute of Further & Higher Education.

Playing as a midfielder, he made 422 appearances and scored 45 goals in the Football League between 1982 and 1997 playing for West Bromwich Albion, Walsall, Birmingham City and Grimsby Town. before joining Boston United and then having a spell as manager of Wisbech Town. He has since held various positions within the youth team back at Grimsby Town.

Playing career
Childs was born in Kings Heath, Birmingham. He started his football career as a trainee with West Bromwich Albion, moving on for a fee of £15,000 to Walsall where he played 180 games in all competitions. A move to Birmingham City followed for a fee of £21,500, and two seasons later he joined Grimsby Town.He helped Grimsby to two successive promotions, from the Fourth Division in the 1989–90 season and from the Third Division the following year.

Released by Grimsby after eight years and nearly 300 games, Childs was appointed player-manager of Wisbech Town, newly elected to the Southern League Midland Division. He led the club to fifth place in the league and the second round proper of the FA Cup before poor form led to his dismissal. He then joined Boston United where he stayed until the end of the 1999–2000 season.

Coaching career
He is a qualified coach, former community Officer at Grimsby Town, and Sports Development Manager at Grimsby Institute of Further & Higher Education.

References

External links

1964 births
Living people
Footballers from Birmingham, West Midlands
English footballers
Association football midfielders
West Bromwich Albion F.C. players
Walsall F.C. players
Birmingham City F.C. players
Grimsby Town F.C. players
Boston United F.C. players
Wisbech Town F.C. players
English Football League players
English football managers
Grimsby Town F.C. non-playing staff